Crich is a civil parish in the Amber Valley district of Derbyshire, England.  The parish contains 52 listed buildings that are recorded in the National Heritage List for England.  Of these, one is listed at Grade I, the highest of the three grades, one is at Grade II*, the middle grade, and the others are at Grade II, the lowest grade.  The parish contains the villages of Crich, Fritchley, Whatstandwell, and Wheatcroft, and the surrounding countryside.  Most of the listed buildings are houses, cottages and associated structures, farmhouses and farm buildings.  In the parish is the National Tramway Museum, and a number of structures that have been moved from other sites to the museum are listed.  The other listed buildings include churches and chapels, a bridge over the Cromford Canal and a road bridge over the River Derwent, public houses, buildings associated with tramways, a milepost, a village cross, a memorial tower, and a village telephone kiosk.


Key

Buildings

References

Citations

Sources

 

Lists of listed buildings in Derbyshire